Askold and Dir (Haskuldr or Hǫskuldr and Dyr or Djur in Old Norse; died in 882), mentioned in both the Primary Chronicle and the Nikon Chronicle, were the earliest known purportedly Norse rulers of Kiev.

Primary Chronicle
The Primary Chronicle relates that Askold and Dir were sanctioned by Rurik to go to Constantinople (Norse Miklagård, Slavic Tsargrad). When travelling on the Dnieper, they settled in Kiev seizing power over the Polans who had been paying tribute to the Khazars. The chronicle also states that they were killed by Oleg the Seer in 882. According to the Primary Chronicle, Oleg came to the foot of the Hungarian hill using trickery, as after concealing his troops in a boat, he sent messengers to Askold and Dir, representing himself as a stranger on his way to Greece on an errand for Oleg and for Igor', the prince's son, and requesting that they should come forth to greet them as members of their race, and killed them with soldiers hidden in the boats popping out, saying Askold and Dir is not worthy of ruling the city since they are not of princely birth. Vasily Tatishchev, Boris Rybakov and some other Russian and Ukrainian historians interpreted the 882 coup d'état in Kiev as the reaction of the pagan Varangians to Askold's baptism. Tatishchev went so far as to style Askold "the first Rus' martyr".

Al-Masudi
The only foreign source to mention one of the co-rulers is the Arab historian Al-Masudi. According to him, "king al-Dir [Dayr] was the first among the kings of the Slavs." Although some scholars have tried to prove that "al-Dir" refers to a Slavic ruler and Dir's contemporary, this speculation is questionable and it is at least equally probable that "al-Dir" and Dir were the same person.

Facts and records

The Rus' attack on Constantinople in June 860 took the Greeks by surprise, "like a thunderbolt from heaven," as it was put by Patriarch Photios in his famous oration written for the occasion. Although the Slavonic chronicles tend to associate this expedition with the names of Askold and Dir (and to date it to 866), the connection remains tenuous. Despite Photius' own assertion that he sent a bishop to the land of Rus' which became Christianized and friendly to Byzantium, most historians discard the idea of Askold's subsequent conversion as apocryphal.

A Kievan legend identifies Askold's burial mound with Uhorska Hill, where Olga of Kiev later built two churches, devoted to Saint Nicholas and to Saint Irene. Today this place on the steep bank of the Dnieper is marked by a monument called Askold's Grave.

Legacy
Russian screw frigate Askold (1854) (see List of Russian steam frigates)
Russian cruiser Askold (1900)
Askold's Grave(19th century Russian Opera by Alexey)

See also
List of Ukrainian rulers
Book of Veles

References

External links

 Guide to Askold's Grave
 Yasterbov, O. The reign of the princes Askold and Dyr: beginnings of the mighty Kyivan state. Day. 29 November 2005. 

People from Kyiv
9th-century Vikings
Princes
882 deaths
Year of birth unknown